Rejuvenation is an American manufacturer and direct marketer of light fixtures and hardware. The company manufactures most of their lighting in Portland, Oregon. Williams-Sonoma, Inc. acquired the company in November 2011.

History
Rejuvenation began in 1977 as an architectural salvage shop in a former saloon in North Portland. Jim Kelly began the business with $1,000 and an interest in architectural salvage. When business was slow, Kelly rebuilt vintage light fixtures. 

Demand for the fixtures grew, and soon Kelly began manufacturing reproduction lighting in his Portland factory and selling it nationally through a mail-order catalog. A website was added in 1997, a store in Seattle, Washington, that launched in 2004, and a Los Angeles store located in the Helms Bakery buildings in late 2011, along with a Berkeley store in 2012. Rejuvenation was acquired by Williams-Sonoma, Inc., in November 2011.

Today, Rejuvenation is America's largest manufacturer of authentic reproduction lighting and house parts. Additionally, the company is known for its commitment to green manufacturing and its support for livable communities.

References

External links
Rejuvenation Official Website

Online retailers of the United States
Williams-Sonoma
Lighting brands
Companies based in Portland, Oregon
Interior design
Electrical components
Lighting
American companies established in 1977
Retail companies established in 1977
1977 establishments in Oregon
2011 mergers and acquisitions